El Clásico Del Sur was a derby played in the Liga MX. The clubs Puebla FC and Veracruz were involved. This rivalry dated back to the amateur era from the early 1930s, before both clubs had been admitted into the professional division in 1944. The name suggests that it is the main football derby in South Mexico.

The rivalry was so big back then that the first match both clubs had in the professional era was against each other in the Copa Mexico tournament in 1943. That game ended in a tie. Both clubs had an early success in the México Primera División in the 1940s and 1950s which made the matches held by these two clubs even more intense. With Puebla's 2 Copa Mexico titles and Veracruz' 2 league titles, the clásico was not contested in 1953, mainly due to economic problems Veracruz had in the mid-1950s. Puebla folded in 1957 due to economic problems and in addition, its home stadium had burned down. The derby would not be played again until 1970 when once again after almost 20 years, the clubs met each other in the 1970 league tournament. Since then, Veracruz made the Estadio Luis de la Fuente their home, and Puebla began the 1970s in their new Estadio Cuauhtémoc. The first match they played since 1953 was held in Puebla in the week 15 of the league tournament which ended in a 1–1 draw.

In the 1980s, the Puebla team would dominate the rivalry games and would also obtain two league titles. In the 1990s, they would face each other 16 times in the league tournaments throughout the decade. Puebla would win 6, lose 7, and draw 3. In the Summer 1999 tournament, Veracruz would beat Puebla, and Puebla would be relegated to the second division, but would remain in the first division for Winter 1999 after buying the franchise of the recently promoted club. In 2004, Puebla would once again be relegated. This time, Veracruz would beat them in week 14 and would send them to the second division. After Puebla's promotion in 2007, it was Veracruz's turn to play in the second division this time, after Puebla defeated Veracruz 2–1 in their home stadium in week 14. Veracruz would have to win their final two matches to remain in the Primera División, a task that they would not achieve, which condemned them to some second division action.

It wasn't until Veracruz bought the newly-promoted La Piedad franchise in 2013 that fans of both sides would see another rivalry game. La Piedad effectively lost its team, giving Veracruz a spot in Liga MX, and since then, the two would have rivalry games again.

In all, Puebla and Veracruz played 68 official matches including league and cup. Puebla has the best record with 30 wins 15 draws and 23 losses with 108 goals scored and 97 conceded. Jorge Comas has the most goals scored in this derby with Veracruz, totalling 8, followed by Puebla's Silvio Fogeul with 7.

With the disaffiliation and dissolution of Veracruz in December 2019, the rivalry is now dormant, barring any resurrection of the club.

League Matches

1944–1952
These are only the league matches.

From 1952 to 1970, no matches took place due to economic problems with both clubs in the 1950s, Puebla FC folded in 1957 and would not be reformed until 1964 in the second division. The classico would reform after puebla's promotion in 1970.

1975 – 1996

Split season
In 1996 the long tournaments ended and instead two separate short tournaments would be played with one in the winter and one in the summer. By this means the Copa Mexico tormentor would cease to exist.

After 5 years in Ascenso MX, Veracruz is returned to Liga MX since June 4, 2013 when La Piedad was sold the team and moved to Veracruz

Notables Clásicos
 On April 30, 2005, After having 3 years of poor play Puebla had fallen to the bottom of the regulation table
and in the 16 round of the 2005 Clausrua tournament Puebla loss 2–1 with a goal score by Lucas Ayala in the 90' and so condemning Puebla to the second division.

 On April 11, 2008'Almost 3 years to the date when Veracruz defeated Puebla and send them to the second division, Puebla now defeated Veracruz in the round 14 and practically relegated Veracruz to the second division, where they remain since 2008.
 On August 11, 2013'More than 5 years to June 4, 2013 when Veracruz returned to the Liga MX since 2008 when La Piedad was sold the team to Veracruz and will face in Puebla again in Clasico 65 (Clasico del Sur).
 29 October 2019, on week 16 of the 2019 Liga MX autumn tournament, Veracruz snapped a 41-game winless streak dating back to August 2018 by beating Puebla 1-0 with a goal by Englishman Colin Kazim-Richards.

Top-scoring individuals
Tiburones Rojos de Veracruz
Jorge Comas

Puebla FC
 Silvio Fogel

Footnotes

External links
 https://web.archive.org/web/20090411233504/http://www.mediotiempo.com/equipo.php?id_equipo=168

Club Puebla
Football rivalries in Mexico
C.D. Veracruz